Elyashiv (lit. God will bring back) is a moshav in central Israel. Located in the Sharon plain, it falls under the jurisdiction of Hefer Valley Regional Council.

History
The moshav was founded on a site once occupied by the Arab village Khirbet esh Sheikh Mohammed  ("The ruin of Sheikh Mohammed"). In 1882, the PEF's  Survey of Western Palestine found that it consisted of a few adobe huts among  ruins. Ancient glazed pottery has been found there.

Although Yemenite neighborhoods had been established near many agricultural settlements, it was not until 1930 that independent Yemenite settlements were approved. After a prolonged struggle by the Yemenite Workers Federation in Palestine, three moshav ovdim were established: Marmorek in 1930, Tirat Shalom in 1931, and Elyashiv on 13 November 1933. Of these, Elyashiv was the largest and the only one that survived as a moshav. The original fifty families were Yemenite Jews who had been in Palestine since the 1920s. They belonged to an organization of Yemenite Jews called "Shabazi", founded in Petach-Tikva in 1931. It is named after a high priest in the time of Nehemiah.

The land for the moshav was provided by the Jewish National Fund, which had purchased a very large tract from a Lebanese Maronite in 1929 with the help of a bribe paid to the seller's legal representative. Agricultural instructors were provided by the Jewish Agency. However, unlike with other moshavot in the Hefer Valley, no financial assistance was provided by the moshav movement. The first decades were marked by continual conflict with the Jewish Agency.

The population was 310 in 1945 and 460 in 1952.

References

Bibliography

External links
Survey of Western Palestine, Map 10:    IAA, Wikimedia commons
Google-map

Moshavim
Hitahdut HaIkarim
Populated places established in 1933
Jewish villages in Mandatory Palestine
Populated places in Central District (Israel)
Yemeni-Jewish culture in Israel
1933 establishments in Mandatory Palestine